Simon Greenleaf (December 5, 1783 – October 6, 1853), was an American lawyer and jurist. He was born at Newburyport, Massachusetts before moving to New Gloucester where he was admitted to the Cumberland County bar.

Early life and legal career
Greenleaf's family traces its ancestry back to Edmund Greenleaf, who lived in Ipswich, Suffolk in England before emigrating and settling in Newburyport, Massachusetts. The Greenleaf family flourished in this part of Massachusetts for almost 150 years prior to Simon's birth in 1783. Simon's father, Moses Greenleaf, married Lydia Parsons, daughter of Rev. Jonathan Parsons of Newburyport. Their son Moses Greenleaf (1777–1834), Simon's older brother, became a distinguished surveyor and mapmaker in Maine.

In the 1790s, Simon's parents moved to New Gloucester in Maine, leaving him in Newburyport under the care of his grandfather Jonathan Greenleaf. There Simon was educated at the Latin school and studied the Greco-Roman classics. When he turned 16 years old, he rejoined his parents in New Gloucester. In 1801 he joined the law office of Ezekiel Whitman (later the Chief Justice of Maine) and in 1806 was admitted to the Cumberland County bar as a legal practitioner. On 22 Mar 1806, in New Gloucester, he married Hannah Kingman.

He then opened a legal practice at Standish, but six months later relocated to Gray, where he practised for twelve years, and in 1818 moved to Portland. Greenleaf's political preferences were aligned with the Federalist Party, and in 1816 he was an unsuccessful candidate for that party in Cumberland County for the Senate. He was reporter of the Supreme Court of Maine from 1820 to 1832, and published nine volumes of Reports of Cases in the Supreme Court of Maine (1820–1832).

Greenleaf was elected a member of the American Antiquarian Society in 1820.

He was awarded the honorary Doctor of Laws degree by Harvard in 1834. He received the same honor from Amherst in 1845, and again from the University of Alabama in 1852. In 1848, he was elected as a member of the American Philosophical Society.

Professorships
In 1833, Greenleaf was named to the Royall professorship, and in 1846 succeeded Judge Joseph Story as Dane professor of law at Harvard University. Greenleaf contributed extensively to the development of Harvard Law School, including expansion of the Harvard Law Library. He was retained as chief counsel by the Warren Bridge group in the US Supreme Court case Charles River Bridge v. Warren Bridge 36 U.S. 420 (1837), where the case laid down the rule that public contracts must be construed in favor of states.

In 1848, Greenleaf retired from his active duties, and became professor emeritus. After being for many years president of the Massachusetts Bible Society, he died at Cambridge. Greenleaf's well-known work, a Treatise on the Law of Evidence, is considered a classic of American jurisprudence.

Contributions to Christian apologetics
Greenleaf is an important figure in the development of that Christian school of thought known as legal or juridical apologetics. This school of thought is typified by legally trained scholars applying the canons of legal proof and judicial argument to the defense of Christian belief. Greenleaf's Testimony of the Evangelists (1846) set the model for many subsequent works by legal apologists. He is distinguished as one who applied the canons of the ancient document rule to establish the authenticity of the  gospel accounts, as well as cross-examination principles in assessing the testimony of those who bore witness to the crucifixion and resurrection of Christ. His style of reasoning is reflected in the apologetic works by John Warwick Montgomery (1931- ), Josh McDowell (1939- ), and Ross Clifford (1951- ).

Several evangelical books and websites portray Greenleaf as an atheist who set out to disprove the Gospels, and claim that instead the evidence for Jesus' resurrection convinced him to become a Christian. Greenleaf was a devout evangelical Episcopalian, and no evidence exists that he ever doubted the truth of the Gospels.

Other Writings 
Greenleaf's principal work of legal scholarship is a Treatise on the Law of Evidence (3 vols., 1842–1853), and which remained a standard textbook in American law throughout the Nineteenth century. He also published A Full Collection of Cases Overruled, Denied, Doubted, or Limited in their Application, taken from American and English Reports (1821). He prepared and published Reports of Cases Argued and Determined by the Supreme Judicial Court of the State of Maine in nine volumes (1820–1832). He revised for the American courts William Cruise's Digest of Laws respecting Real Property (3 vols., 1849–1850). Greenleaf was also the author of A Brief Inquiry into the Origin and Principles of Free Masonry (1820), and wrote a memoir of the life of his colleague Joseph Story - A Discourse Commemorative of the Life and Character of the Hon. Joseph Story (1845).

Mentioned by actress Marium Carvell, playing Selma Davis, in Judgment (a.k.a. Apocalypse IV)

Simon Greenleaf School of Law
In 1980 it opened its doors at Trinity Lutheran Church, 4101 Nohl Ranch Rd, Anaheim, CA 92807. In August 1982, it was relocated to 3855 E. La Palma Ave, Anaheim, California 92807 that was named in his honor, The Simon Greenleaf School of Law. This school was founded by the Lutheran theologian-lawyer John Warwick Montgomery. From 1980-88 the law school published a journal named The Simon Greenleaf Law Review. In 1997 the law school became part of Trinity International University.

Bibliography
 Simon Greenleaf, The Testimony of the Evangelists Examined by The Rules of Evidence Administered in Courts of Justice, reprint of the 1874 edition, (Grand Rapids: Baker Book House, 1984). 
 Simon Greenleaf, "The Testimony of the Evangelists," reprinted from the 1903 edition as an appendix in John Warwick Montgomery, The Law Above The Law, (Minneapolis: Bethany Fellowship, 1975), pp. 91–140 & 149-163.

See also

Topics
 Apologetics
 Christian Apologetics
 Arguments for the Existence of God
 Thomism
 Evidentialist
 Jesus Christ
 Testimony of the Evangelist
 The Case for Christ
 Atheism

Apologists
 Ross Clifford
 Josh McDowell
 John Warwick Montgomery
 Lee Strobel

References

 "Professor Simon Greenleaf" in Ross Clifford, Leading Lawyers ' Case for the Resurrection, (Edmonton: Canadian Institute for Law, theology and Public Policy, 1996), pp. 41–55 
 John Warwick Montgomery, "Simon Greenleaf," Eternity magazine, November 1986, p. 21.
 "Simon Greenleaf," in Dictionary of American Biography, Vol. 4, Allen Johnson and Dumas Malone, eds. New York: Charles Scribner%27s Sons, pp 583–584.
Summary of Charles River Bridge v. Warren Bridge from OYEZ

External links

 
 
Simon Greenleaf's Testimony of the Evangelists
 Philip Johnson, "Juridical Apologists 1600-2000 AD: A Bio-Bibliographical Essay," Global Journal of Classical Theology, 3/1 (2002).

1783 births
1853 deaths
American legal scholars
Politicians from Portland, Maine
Harvard Law School faculty
People from New Gloucester, Maine
Christian apologists
People from Newburyport, Massachusetts
People from Gray, Maine
Lawyers from Portland, Maine
Maine Federalists
Members of the American Antiquarian Society
19th-century American lawyers